Tobias and the Angel is the title given to paintings and other artworks depicting a scene from the Book of Tobit in which Tobias, son of Tobit, meets an angel without realising he is an angel (5.5–6) and is then instructed by the angel what to do with a giant fish he catches (6.2–9).

Paintings

 Tobit with the Angel by Gerbrand van den Eeckhout
 Tobias and the Angel (1875) by Evelyn De Morgan

Prints

 Tobias and the Angel by Hercules Seghers

Literature and theatre
 Tobias and the Angel (1930), play by James Bridie (1888–1951)
 Tobias and the Angel (opera) (1999), community opera
 Tobias and the Angel, 1975 novel by Frank Yerby

External links